Coochie Brake is a cypress swamp in Louisiana of more than 700 acres. It is between Verda and Atlanta. This swamp also referred to as a brake is home to alligators, massive cypress trees, deer and much more. Coochie Brake is a colorful local source full of history and folklore dating back to when it was a Spanish fort. Once owned by JM Ferguson, it is now a state owned property.

References

Swamps of Louisiana
Landforms of Winn Parish, Louisiana